Atrocalopteryx coomani is a species of broad-winged damselfly in the family Calopterygidae.

The IUCN conservation status of Atrocalopteryx coomani is "NT", near threatened. The species may be considered threatened in the near future. The IUCN status was reviewed in 2018.

References

Further reading

 

Calopterygidae
Articles created by Qbugbot
Insects described in 1935